Clydebank Central is one of the six wards used to elect members of the West Dunbartonshire Council. It elects four Councillors.

The ward covers northern parts of the town of Clydebank, although despite its name it only includes part of the town centre, namely the areas north of the Forth and Clyde Canal at the Clyde Shopping Centre, Clyde Retail Park and Clydebank Business Centre, while south of the canal is within the Clydebank Waterfront ward. West of Boquhanran Road tunnel, the boundary between the wards changes from the canal to the Argyle Line / North Clyde Line railway tracks. Residential neighbourhoods in the ward include Drumry, Kilbowie, Linnvale, North Mountblow, Parkhall and Radnor Park

Councillors

Election Results

2022 Election
2022 West Dunbartonshire Council election

2017 Election
2017 West Dunbartonshire Council election

2012 Election
2012 West Dunbartonshire Council election

2007 Election
2007 West Dunbartonshire Council election

References

Wards of West Dunbartonshire
Clydebank